Alicia Thornton or Alicia Meynel  (1780s – 1800s) was a British  horsewoman. She has been called the "first female jockey" after she took part in a horse race at what is now York Racecourse in Knavesmire in 1804.

Life
Thornton's father may have made watches in Norwich or have owned land in Essex and nothing is known of her mother. She came to notice in 1804 when she challenged a man to a horse race. Some called her Alice Meynell but others Alice Thornton as it was said she was married to Colonel Thomas Thornton and he was keen on sports, horses and gambling. Others referred to her as Colonel Thonton's lady. She challenged her sister's partner (brother-in-law) and neighbour Captain Flint to a horse race. Her husband offered her his horse and placed a bet on her victory. The prize was said to be either 500 guineas or 1,500 guineas. Thornton later said he believed it was 500 guineas and he had only claimed the 1,500 figure to attract a crowd.

She was a skilled horsewoman as she rode with the hounds when they were hunting. She rode side saddle but her expertise was known to her friends.

The meeting took place on 25 August 1804 with her "" and Flint rode his horse "". She has been called the "first female jockey" after she took part in a horse race at what is now York Racecourse in Knavesmire.

It was said that was 100,000 people watching as she held the lead for most of the four mile race. Captain Flint eventually won the race but she won the backing of the crowd with her spirited performance, attire and demeanor.

References

1780s births
1800s deaths
British female jockeys